Jaroslav Hrabě Bořita z Martinic (6 January 1582 – 21 November 1649) was a Czech nobleman and a representative of Ferdinand II, Holy Roman Emperor who, along with Vilém Slavata of Chlum, was a victim in the 1618 Defenestration of Prague (also known as the Second Defenestration of Prague). In 1621 he became Bohemian Count and in 1622 he became Royal Statholder of Bohemia and Supreme Burgrave of Bohemia in 1638.

Personal life
Jaroslav was a member of the Martinic noble family. He was married 4 times. First time he married Maria Eusebie von  (1584–1634), second time he married Countess Elize Maria Magdalena zu Vrtby (died in 1643), third time to Katerina Ludmila Franziska Talatzkova z Gestieticz (died in 1649) and fourth time to Alena Barbara Kostomlatski z Vresovic. He had 10 children, all by his first marriage.
His eldest daughter was Countess Barbara Eusebia (d. 1656), second wife of Margrave Christian Wilhelm of Brandenburg.

See also
 Thirty Years' War
 Defenestrations of Prague

References

Bohemian nobility
17th-century Bohemian people
1582 births
1649 deaths
Execution survivors